Toytown Germany is an English-language community website for Germany. It is an information resource, a meeting point, and a communication platform for English-speaking foreigners throughout the country.  This moderated community is free to join, but requires registration to participate. The site is frequented by travellers and expatriates alike. It is owned and operated by The Local Europe AB, publisher of The Local, an English-language digital news publisher with local editions in Sweden, Germany, France, Spain, Switzerland, Norway, and Italy.

Toytown Germany, known to its users as "TT", provides information about all aspects of life in Germany and its various cities and regions, from local bar and restaurant guides with reviews to events and advice on dealing with the confusion expatriates often face when dealing with life in a new country. The site additionally includes areas for classified ads. The heart of the site is the chat forum in which English speakers discuss news, pose questions and answers, and organise social events.

Toytown Germany is partnered with major German news companies including Der Spiegel, Deutsche Welle, and Die Welt. News feeds from those companies are published on the website. In return, the latest German news related discussions from the TT chat forum are published on the English news pages of Die Welt. While those mainstream news companies provide professional reporting, Toytown Germany provides the general public with a community platform on which to discuss the latest news from Germany.

History 
The site was originally created in August, 2002 as "Toytown Munich". The name originates from the observation that Munich was an unusually clean, well-organised, and crime-free city, relatively free of most urban blight including graffiti and slums. In mid-2006 the site merged with Britboard, another expatriate site geared toward British expatriates in Germany. Shortly thereafter a decision was made to expand to cover all of Germany and the name was changed to reflect this.

References

External links
 http://www.toytowngermany.com
 http://www.alexa.com/data/details/main/toytowngermany.com
 jetzt.muenchen 22.Nov.2005 pdf
 "Die Spielzeugstadt als Lebenshilfe"  Süddeutsche Zeitung Tuesday 26.Jul.2005

German social networking websites
British expatriates in Germany